No. 670 Squadron AAC is a British Army Army Air Corps squadron responsible for the Operational Conversion Phase of the Army Pilots’ Course. The Squadron is based at RAF Shawbury.

See also

 RAF Shawbury
 Ascent Flight Training
 List of Army Air Corps aircraft units

References

Army Air Corps aircraft squadrons